Ab-e Now-e Khani Yek (also Romanized as Āb-e Now Khānī Yek; also known as Āb-e Now) is a village in Nujin Rural District, in the Central District of Farashband County, Fars Province, Iran. At the 2006 census, its population was 80, in 19 families.

References 

Populated places in Farashband County